Fulton County Airport  is a public use airport located four nautical miles (5 mi, 7 km) north of the central business district of Wauseon, a city in Fulton County, Ohio, United States. It is owned by the Fulton County Commissioners. This airport is included in the National Plan of Integrated Airport Systems for 2011–2015, which categorized it as a general aviation facility.

Although most U.S. airports use the same three-letter location identifier for the FAA and IATA, this airport is assigned USE by the FAA, but has no designation from the IATA.

Facilities and aircraft 
Fulton County Airport covers an area of 42 acres (17 ha) at an elevation of 781 feet (238 m) above mean sea level. It has two runways: 9/27 is 3,882 by 75 feet (1,183 x 23 m) with an asphalt surface and 18/36 is 2,115 by 75 feet (645 x 23 m) with an asphalt and turf surface.

For the 12-month period ending June 21, 2010, the airport had 4,500 aircraft operations, an average of 12 per day: 98.6% general aviation, 1.3% air taxi, and 0.1% military.
At that time there were 24 aircraft based at this airport: 83% single-engine, 13% ultralight, and 4% multi-engine.

St. Vincent Mercy Medical Center's Aérospatiale SA 365 Dauphin LifeFlight helicopter is hangared at the airport for medical evacuations.

References

External links 
 Stewart Aviation Services, the fixed-base operator
 Aerial image as of April 1994 from USGS The National Map
 

County airports in Ohio
Buildings and structures in Fulton County, Ohio
Transportation in Fulton County, Ohio